Roßkopf or Rosskopf is a peak in the Carnic Alps of Austria, near the boundary with Italy. On June 10, 2011, the Austrian Government offered it and nearby peak Grosse Kinigat for sale for €121,000.

References

Mountains of Austria
Mountains of the Alps